Netzwerk is an Italian Eurodance project formed in 1992. They released six singles, two of which were top 10 hits in Italy. A comeback single was released after more than 20 years of inactivity on October 11th, 2019 entitled Just Another Dream.

The project has featured three different vocalists. Sandra Chambers provided the vocals on "Send Me an Angel" and "Breakdown". Simona Jackson provided the vocals on "Passion" and "Memories". Sharon May Linn provided the vocals on "Dream". 

In 2019, Jackson returned to Netzwerk after nearly 25 years to provide the lead vocals for their comeback single "Just Another Dream", and performs at 90s Revival Shows around the world as Netzwerk. Two years later in 2021, Netzwerk released "Last Summer", a duet featuring Jackson and former fellow vocalist Sandy Chambers.

Discography

Singles

References

Italian Eurodance groups
Musical groups established in 1992
Italian dance music groups
Musical groups disestablished in 1997